Liangxiang may refer to:

 Liangxiang, Beijing (良乡地区), in Fangshan District, Beijing
Liang Xiang, Chinese politician

See also
 Liangting, Susong County (凉亭镇), town in southern Anhui
 Liangting Township (凉亭乡), Huaining County, Anhui